The 2022 Old Dominion Monarchs baseball team represented Old Dominion University in the sport of baseball for the 2022 college baseball season. The Monarchs competed in Division I of the National Collegiate Athletic Association (NCAA) and in Conference USA East Division. They played their home games at Bud Metheny Baseball Complex, on the university's Norfolk campus. The team was coached by Chris Finwood, who was in his eleventh season with the Monarchs.

Preseason

C-USA media poll
The Conference USA preseason poll was released on February 16, 2022 with the Monarchs predicted to finish in third place in the conference.

Preseason All-CUSA team
Brock Gagliardi – Catcher
Tommy Bell – Infielder
Andy Garriola – Outfielder
Carter Trice – Outfielder
Jason Hartline – Pitcher
Noah Dean – Pitcher

Personnel

Schedule and results

Schedule Source:
*Rankings are based on the team's current ranking in the D1Baseball poll.

Postseason

Rankings

References

External links
•	Old Dominion Baseball

Old Dominion
Old Dominion Monarchs baseball seasons
Old Dominion Monarchs baseball
Old Dominion